Quesnelia humilis is a species of flowering plant in the family Bromeliaceae, endemic to Brazil (São Paulo and Paraná). It was first described by Carl Christian Mez in 1892. It is found in the Atlantic Forest ecoregion of south and southeastern Brazil.

See also

References

humilis
Endemic flora of Brazil
Flora of the Atlantic Forest
Flora of Paraná (state)
Flora of São Paulo (state)
Plants described in 1892